Bolívar District may refer to:

 Bolívar District, Bolívar, in Bolívar province, La Libertad region, Peru
 Bolívar District, Grecia, in Alajuela province, Costa Rica

See also
 Bolívar (disambiguation)